Casais Robustos is a small village located in the Santarém District of Portugal. It has a population of around 280 people, making it a relatively small and quiet community.

The village is situated within the Natural Park of Serras de Aire and Candeeiros, an area known for its stunning natural beauty and rich biodiversity. The park is home to a variety of flora and fauna, and it is a popular destination for nature lovers and outdoor enthusiasts.

According to the 2001 census, the population of Casais Robustos is relatively evenly divided between men and women, with 137 men and 143 women. The age distribution of the population is fairly typical for a small village, with 45 people under the age of 14, 41 people between the ages of 15 and 24, 139 people between the ages of 25 and 64, and 55 people over the age of 65.

Overall, Casais Robustos is a peaceful and quiet village with a strong sense of community and a rich natural environment. It is a popular destination for those looking to escape the hustle and bustle of city life and enjoy the tranquility of rural Portugal.

Demography

References
INE, Censos 2001

External links
 Alcanena Municipality Official Website 
Serras de Aire e Candeeiros Natural Park Website

Populated places in Santarém District